The 1931–32 season was Stoke City's 32nd season in the Football League and the 12th in the Second Division.

It was a good season for Stoke as they were finally able to mount a serious promotion challenge. They were involved in the race throughout the season and just missed out finishing third, two points behind second-placed Leeds United. Too many winnable matches were drawn with fourteen matches ending on level terms.

In March 1932 away at Bury, 17-year-old Stanley Matthews made his professional debut and he would go on to become one of the greatest players in English football.

Season review

League
The 1931–32 season proved to be an entertaining season for Stoke as they were involved in the hunt for promotion throughout the campaign, just missing out in third spot in the final placings. Their draw tally of 14 cost Stoke dearly in the end and on a number of occasions Stoke were denied victory due to last minute equalisers from their opponents. There were a number of good things to come out of the season, including 25 goals from Joe Mawson and a 14 match unbeaten run from mid-November to the beginning of February. Manager Tom Mather was able to select the same starting eleven for 16 consecutive matches, a club record. Stoke, suffered the fewest defeats in the Second Division.

The directors, who had used cash resources carefully, allowed Mather to build up his squad, and he duly pulled off three excellent deals, the returning Harry Davies from Huddersfield Town, goalkeeper Roy John and winger Joe Johnson. Johnson was perhaps the shrewdest of the three, for Stoke became aware that his club Bristol City were struggling for money and after a goalless draw at Ashton Gate in April 1932 Stoke paid Bristol a mere £250 for his signature.

It was at Bury on 19 Match 1932 that Stoke introduced their latest local talent, Stanley Matthews who at the time was described at the time as a 'promising outside right'. Matthews had signed professional contract forms on his 17th birthday (1 February 1932) and was deputising for the injured Bobby Liddle.

FA Cup
Stoke, beat Hull City 3–0 and Sunderland 2–1 in a 2nd replay before been knocked out 3–0 by Bury.

Final league table

Results
Stoke's score comes first

Legend

Football League Second Division

FA Cup

Squad statistics

References

Stoke City F.C. seasons
Stoke